Jimoh Ibrahim (born 24 February 1967) is a Nigerian lawyer, politician, businessman and philanthropist who is now the senator-elect for Ondo South Senatorial District. 

He is the chairman and chief executive officer of Global Fleet Group, a diversified conglomerate based in Nigeria, with business interests and subsidiaries in neighboring West African countries. In July, 2022, he was awarded a doctorate degree in Business by the University of Cambridge, United Kingdom. This makes him the first doctorate degree holder in Business from the same university since it was first established in 1209.

Background
Ibrahim traces his origins to Ondo State, in southwestern Nigeria. He studied law at Obafemi Awolowo University in Ile Ife, Osun State, Nigeria, graduating with the degree of Bachelor of Laws (LLB). Subsequently, he obtained the degree of Master of Public Administration (MPA), also from Obafemi Awolowo University. Later, he attended Harvard University in Cambridge, Massachusetts, USA, graduating with a combined Master of Laws (LLM) and Master's In International Taxation degree.
His investments include the following sectors, among others: oil & gas distribution, hotels, resorts, airlines, banking, real estate, insurance, publishing and investments.

Business interests
Global Fleet Group has the following subsidiary companies, among others:

 Air Nigeria - Lagos, Nigeria - Formerly Virgin Nigeria
 NICON Insurance - Lagos, Nigeria
 Nigeria Reinsurance Corporation - Lagos, Nigeria
 NICON Luxury Hotel - Abuja, Nigeria - Formerly Le' Meridien Hotel
 Global Fleet Oil & Gas - A chain of gasoline stations (estimated at about 200 in 2011), across Nigeria
 The NICON Group - Lagos, Nigeria - Holdings include investment companies, schools, real estate holdings, transport companies and others
 Global Fleet Building - Lagos, Nigeria - Formerly Allied Bank Building
 Meidan Hotel - Lagos, Nigeria
 Global Fleet Industries - Lagos, Nigeria - Formerly HFP Industries Limited
 Energy Bank - Accra, Ghana - A new commercial bank in Ghana, started operations in February 2011
 Oceanic Bank São Tomé - São Tomé, São Tomé and Príncipe - Commercial bank purchased from Oceanic Bank in May 2011.
 Newswatch Magazine - Lagos, Nigeria

Other responsibilities
In 2003, Jimoh Ibrahim mounted an unsuccessful bid to become the governor of Ondo State, on the All Nigeria People's Party (ANPP) ticket. He has authored three books. He is married to Mrs Modupe Jimoh Ibrahim and is the father of four children. He is also the publisher of the National Mirror Newspaper in Nigeria.

Controversy
Sahara Reports published a number of articles making allegations of substantial misconduct during 2013–15.

On Wednesday 11 November 2020, it was reported that the Asset Management Corporation of Nigeria (AMCON) had obtained a court order to freeze bank accounts and seize assets belonging to Jimoh Ibrahim over unpaid NGN69.4 billion debts.

See also
Global Fleet Group
Air Nigeria
Energy Bank

References
https://
"www.vanguardngr.com/2022/07/akeredolu-hails-jimoh-ibrahim-after-obtaining-cambridge-varsitys-business-doctorate-degree/amp/&ved=2ahUKEwj22fD7re_5AhX5wgIHHRr9A-cQFnoECAcQAQ&usg=AOvVaw1OQ6BjlESEn2vU1d4LJaSw

External links
 Interview With Jimoh Ibrahim

1967 births
Living people
People from Ondo State
Nigerian chief executives
Harvard Law School alumni
Obafemi Awolowo University alumni
21st-century Nigerian businesspeople
Nigerian chairpersons of corporations